Archi & Meidy is an Indonesian best selling science comic book, published by Megindo and written by two Indonesian scientists, Yohanes Surya and Wendy Vega. There are 4 volumes. This story is about the life of twin Archi and Meidy who are ten years old. Science is part of their lives, both at home and at school. A story at the end of this comic book, "World Mission", is about the twins, fourteen years later, when they join a secret agent who tried to save the world.

Characters

The Susilo Family 
 Archi Susilo
The male protagonist of the story. He's ten years old, described as an active, smart, and full of curiosity. At school, he's an intelligent and responsible student, elected vice-president of the class. He fights with his twin sister, Meidy, but they care for each other. Archi has a crush on his classmate, Connie.
In World Vision, Archi came back from studying overseas and had got his master degree in nuclear major. Once worked at NASA.
Archi and Meidy's names derive from Archimedes.
 Meidy Susilo
The female protagonist of the story and also the twin sister of Archie. She's an aggressive, smart, and brave ten-year-old girl. She has a bigger ego than her twin brother and gets mad easily. She used to yell to their friends when they pick on Archi.
14 years later, Archi and Meidy joined the World Mission organization, to save the world from extinction. Meidy is a doctor, and head of a hospital. She had a relationship with her partner, Maximilian Vargas.
 Anthony "Anim" Susilo
The big brother of the twins. An 18-year-old who loves to pick on Archi, but does love both twins. He has a girlfriend named Mona Higarashi, his childhood friend and they had their own comic strips in KIDDO Magazine about themselves when they were 10.
He finally joined the World Mission and a head of an anti-biologic guns laboratory.
 Handi Susilo
The father of Anim and the twins. An architect and a good friend of Professor Yosu since elementary school
 Tamara Susilo
The mother of Anim and the twins. Used to be a model, but became a designer after she married.

Indonesian comics